Pas de Deux is a ballet made for New York City Ballet by Jacques d'Amboise to Webern's Six pieces for orchestra. The premiere took place May 29, 1969, at the New York State Theater, Lincoln Center.

Original cast 

 Deborah Flomine
 Jacques d'Amboise

Ballets by Jacques d'Amboise
New York City Ballet repertory
1969 ballet premieres
Ballets to the music of Anton von Webern